Gilles Cresto (born 30 August 1959) is a Monegasque archer. He competed at the 1984 Summer Olympics and the 1988 Summer Olympics.

References

1959 births
Living people
Monegasque male archers
Olympic archers of Monaco
Archers at the 1984 Summer Olympics
Archers at the 1988 Summer Olympics
Place of birth missing (living people)